ER-X is a membrane-associated receptor that is bound and activated by 17α-estradiol and 17β-estradiol and is a putative membrane estrogen receptor (mER). It shows sequence homology with ERα and ERβ and activates the MAPK/ERK pathway. The receptor is insensitive to the antiestrogen ICI-182,780 (fulvestrant).

See also
 ERx
 GPER (GPR30)
 Gq-mER
 Estrogen receptor

References

Human proteins
Transmembrane receptors